Mimas christophi, the alder hawkmoth, is a species of moth of the family Sphingidae.

Distribution 
It is known from the Russian Far East, north-eastern China, South Korea and northern and central Japan.

Description 
The wingspan is 59–77 mm. It is similar to Mimas tiliae but smaller and darker and showing a less extensive variation in forewing colour and pattern.

Biology 
Adults are on wing from late May to late August in Korea.

The larvae have been recorded feeding on Alnus hirsute, Tilia, Acer, Ulmus, Salix and Betula in Primorskiy Kray in Russia and Alnus japonica, Quercus dentata, Ulmus davidiana var. japonica and Tilia amurensis in Korea.

References

Smerinthini
Moths described in 1887
Moths of Japan